Stere Gulea (born 2 August 1943) is a Romanian film director and screenwriter.

He was born in Mihail Kogălniceanu commune, Constanța County, in an Aromanian family that had fled from the Kaliakra region of Southern Dobruja during the 1940 population exchange between Bulgaria and Romania. After graduating from the Mircea cel Bătrân High School in  Constanța, Gulea studied philology at the Pedagogical Institute of Constanța and then pursued his studies at the I.L. Caragiale Institute of Theatre and Film Arts (IATC) in Bucharest, graduating in 1970.

His 1995 movie, State of Things, was submitted by Romania for the Academy Award for Best International Feature Film. In 2018 Gulea was made honorary citizen of Talpa, the commune in Teleorman County where both these movies were shot.

In 2000, then-President Emil Constantinescu awarded him the Order of the Star of Romania, Commander rank.

Filmography
 (2018)
Sunt o babă comunistă (2013)
Weekend with my Mother (2009)
State of Things (1995), also screenplay
 (1993)
Piata Universității - Romania (1991)
The Moromete Family (1988), after Marin Preda's novel, Moromeții
 (1983), screenplay
 (1981), after a Jules Verne novel
 (1978)
 (1970)

References

External links
Cinemagia - Stere Gulea

1943 births
Living people
People from Constanța County
Romanian people of Aromanian descent
Caragiale National University of Theatre and Film alumni
Romanian documentary filmmakers
Romanian film directors
Aromanian film people
Commanders of the Order of the Star of Romania
Mircea cel Bătrân National College (Constanța) alumni